Tanea Jane Heke  is an actor, director and producer of theatre in New Zealand. In 2019 she was appointed as /Director of Toi Whakaari: NZ Drama School.

Career 
Heke is a 1997 graduate from Toi Whakaari: NZ Drama School and was appointed director at the end of 2019 after doing the role as interim director since the beginning of the year. She founded Hāpai Productions to create and support Māori theatre in 2013 with the late Nancy Brunning. Hāpai Productions has a focus on making opportunities for Māori women in theatre. Heke has also worked at Taki Rua Productions, Te Papa Tongarewa where she was an exhibitions manager and Creative New Zealand, where she worked with Carla Van Zon.

Directing 
In 1995 Heke directed Maua Taua by Hinemoana Baker at Taki Rua Theatre as part of their Te Reo Māori season performed in the Māori language. In 1998 Heke directed GrandfatherSon by Kirk Torrance at BATS Theatre.

Acting roles

Honours and awards 
In 2020 Heke won Creative New Zealand's Making a Difference Award, Ngā Tohu Hautūtanga Auaha Toi.

In the 2022 New Year Honours, Heke was appointed a Member of the New Zealand Order of Merit, for services to the arts and Māori.

References 

Living people
New Zealand theatre directors
Toi Whakaari alumni
Year of birth missing (living people)
Members of the New Zealand Order of Merit